In cricket, a player's batting average is the total number of runs they have scored divided by the number of times they have been out, usually given to two decimal places. Since the number of runs a player scores and how often they get out are primarily measures of their own playing ability, and largely independent of their teammates, batting average is a good metric for an individual player's skill as a batter (although the practice of drawing comparisons between players on this basis is not without criticism). The number is also simple to interpret intuitively. If all the batter's innings were completed (i.e. they were out every innings), this is the average number of runs they score per innings. If they did not complete all their innings (i.e. some innings they finished not out), this number is an estimate of the unknown average number of runs they score per innings.

Each player normally has several batting averages, with a different figure calculated for each type of match they play (first-class, one-day, Test matches, List A, T20, etc.), and a player's batting averages may be calculated for individual seasons or series, or at particular grounds, or against particular opponents, or across their whole career.

Batting average has been used to gauge cricket players' relative skills since the 18th century.

Values

Most players have career batting averages in the range of 20 to 40. This is also the desirable range for wicket-keepers, though some fall short and make up for it with keeping skill. Until a substantial increase in scores in the 21st century due to improved bats and smaller grounds among other factors, players who sustained an average above 50 through a career were considered exceptional, and before the development of the heavy roller in the 1870s (which allowed for a flatter, safer cricket pitch) an average of 25 was considered very good.
 All-rounders who are more prominent bowlers than batsmen typically average something between 20 and 30.
 15 and under is typical for specialist bowlers.
 A small number of players have averaged less than 5 for a complete career, though a player with such an average is a liability unless an exceptional bowler as Alf Valentine, B. S. Chandrasekhar or Glenn McGrath were.

Career records for batting average are usually subject to a minimum qualification of 20 innings played or completed, in order to exclude batsmen who have not played enough games for their skill to be reliably assessed. Under this qualification, the highest Test batting average belongs to Australia's Sir Donald Bradman, with 99.94. Given that a career batting average over 50 is exceptional, and that only 4 other players have averages over 60, this is an outstanding statistic. The fact that Bradman's average is so far above that of any other cricketer has led several statisticians to argue that, statistically at least, he was the greatest athlete in any sport.

Disregarding this 20 innings qualification, the highest career test batting average is 112, by Andy Ganteaume, a Trinidadian Keeper-batsman, who was dismissed for 112 in his only test innings. Amongst active players, Kurtis Patterson has the highest average, having scored 144 runs for the loss of one wicket in his two test innings, giving him a batting average of 144. He then fell out of the Australian squad due to a loss of form and injury.

Batting averages in One Day International (ODI) and T20 International (T20I) cricket tend to be lower than in Test cricket because of the need to score runs more quickly. Consequently, batters tend to play riskier strokes and less emphasis is placed on building an innings in order to amass a high individual score. It should also be remembered, especially in relation to the ODI and T20I histograms above, that there were no ODI or T20I matches when Bradman played.

Interpretation
If a batter has been dismissed in every single innings, then this statistic gives exactly the average number of runs they score per innings.

However, for a batter with one or more innings which finished not out, the true mean or average number of runs they score per innings is unknown as it is not known how many runs they would have scored if they could have completed all their not out innings. In this case, this statistic is an estimate of the average number of runs they score per innings. If their scores have a geometric distribution, then this statistic is the maximum likelihood estimate of their true unknown average.

Batting averages can be strongly affected by the number of not outs. For example, Phil Tufnell, who was noted for his poor batting, has an apparently respectable ODI average of 15 (from 20 games), despite a highest score of only 5 not out, as he scored an overall total of 15 runs from 10 innings, but was out only once.

A batter who has not been dismissed in any of the innings over which their average is being calculated does not have a batting average, as division by zero does not give a result.

Leading male batting averages

Test matches

A batting average of above 50 is considered by many as a benchmark to distinguish between a good and a great batsman. Highest male career batting averages in Test matches as follows:

Source:  Cricinfo. Table shows players with at least 20 innings completed. * denotes not out. Last updated: 20 March 2023.

First-class

Highest career batting averages in first-class cricket as follows:

Source:  Cricinfo. Table shows players with at least 50 innings completed, note this table has no requirement for minimum number of runs scored. * denotes not out. Last updated: 12 February 2023.

One Day Internationals

Highest career batting averages in One Day International cricket as follows:

Source:  Cricinfo. Table shows players with at least 20 innings completed. * denotes not out. Last updated: 13 March 2023.

T20 Internationals

Source:  Cricinfo. Table shows players with at least 20 innings completed. * denotes not out. Last updated: 13 March 2023.

Leading female batting averages

Test matches

One Day Internationals

T20 Internationals

Alternatives

Alternative measures of batting effectiveness have been developed, including:

Strike rate

Strike rate measures a different concept to batting average – how quickly the batsman scores (i.e. average number of runs from 100 balls) – so it does not supplant the role of batting average. It is used particularly in limited overs matches, where the speed at which a batter scores is more important than it is in first-class cricket. Strike rate may also be used to compare a player's ability to score runs against differing types of bowling (i.e. spin, fast bowling).

Player rankings

A system of player rankings was developed to produce a better indication of players' current standings than is provided by comparing their averages.

See also
Cricket statistics
Batting average
Bowling average

References

Batting (cricket)
Cricket records and statistics
Cricket terminology